Tom Sawyer is an American former college football coach. He served as the head football coach at Winona State University in Winona, Minnesota, from 1996 to 2021, compiling a record of 197–89. A native of Barron, Wisconsin, Sawyer played college football at Winona State, lettering for four years as a linebacker and punter. He retired after the 2021 season.

Head coaching record

References

External links
 Winona State profile

Year of birth missing (living people)
Living people
American football linebackers
American football punters
Winona State Warriors football coaches
Winona State Warriors football players
Winona State University faculty
People from Barron, Wisconsin
Players of American football from Wisconsin